The term Catholic Patriarchate of Alexandria may refer to:

 Latin Patriarchate of Alexandria, a Roman Catholic titular see
 Coptic Catholic Patriarchate of Alexandria, an Eastern Catholic see
 Melkite Greek Catholic Patriarchate of Alexandria, an Eastern Catholic jurisdiction

See also
 Patriarch of Alexandria
 Patriarchate of Alexandria (disambiguation)
 Greek Orthodox Church of Alexandria
 Coptic Orthodox Church
 Latin Patriarch (disambiguation)
 Patriarchate of Antioch (disambiguation)
 Patriarchate of Jerusalem (disambiguation)
 Latin Patriarchate of Constantinople